Gerald Warner "Jerry" Brightman (September 1, 1953 – March 9, 2015) was an American pedal steel guitarist  who played for Buck Owens and The Buckaroos and featured on television's Hee Haw along with performing on many top 10 records with Buck, Susan Raye, Tony Booth, and others.

Biography
He was born on September 1, 1953 in Akron, Ohio.

Impressing audiences at an early age, he began playing professionally in 1966. After his run with the Buckaroos in 1975, he worked on the business side of the music industry from 1977-1982. He was also nominated for a position on the CMA Board of Directors.  Jerry left the music business in 1982. In 2002, he returned to music and released his first solo CD Back Again and then a second titled, Back Again, To the Country in 2003 on Slidestation Productions. Major recording artists with Jerry appearing on include: Buck Owens, Susan Raye, Tony Booth, Arlo Guthrie, and David Frizzell.

For a time he built a number of ‘Performance’-branded pedal steel guitars in Ohio.

He died in his sleep on March 9, 2015.

Sources

External links
[ Allmusic]
Billboard
CMT
Music Match Guide
Northern Nashville Steel Guitar
Peavey Electronics
Stay In Tune String Company
Yahoo Music

External links

1953 births
2015 deaths
Musicians from Akron, Ohio
Steel guitarists
Bakersfield sound